is a professional Japanese baseball player. He plays pitcher for the Tokyo Yakult Swallows.

References

External links

 NPB.com

1994 births
Living people
Baseball people from Nagoya
Japanese baseball players
Nippon Professional Baseball pitchers
Tokyo Yakult Swallows players